Kevin Etten is an American screenwriter and television producer. He began his career as a writer for The Late Show with David Letterman, and then moved on to be the screenwriter and producer for notable television series including Reaper, Workaholics, Scrubs, and Desperate Housewives. He has been nominated twice for Golden Globe awards and has won once.

Biography
Etten was born in a neighborhood on the north side of Chicago. While at Harvard University, he played for the Crimson Hockey team and was editor of The Harvard Lampoon. Beginning as a writer for the Late Show with David Letterman, Etten has since been a part of the crews of the dramedies Ed and Desperate Housewives, the latter for which he also served as a producer. In 2011, Etten began as executive producer of Comedy Central's new show, Workaholics. On November 15, 2019, Etten co-wrote and produced the Tom Gormican film The Unbearable Weight of Massive Talent.

Awards 
He was nominated for two Golden Globes awards and won the Best Television Series-Musical or Comedy award in 2006 for Desperate Housewives.

References

External links
 

American television producers
American male screenwriters
American soap opera writers
Living people
Year of birth missing (living people)
The Harvard Lampoon alumni
American male television writers
Late Show with David Letterman
Harvard Crimson men's ice hockey players